Crackhead: The DJ? Acucrack Remix Album is a 2004 remix album by Pigface and DJ? Acucrack.

Track listing

2004 remix albums
Pigface albums